David Mahoney may refer to:

 David Mahoney (soccer) (born 1981), American soccer goalkeeper
 David Mahoney (conductor) (born 1987), British conductor, producer, performer and creative director
 David J. Mahoney (1923–2000), American business leader, philanthropist and author
 Dave Mahoney (1892–1947), Australian rules footballer